Dunster Park and Heathlands is a 466.6 hectare biological Site of Special Scientific Interest in Somerset, notified in 2000.

This site is located in the north-east of the Exmoor National Park within a few miles of the Bristol Channel near the village of Dunster, and is notified for nationally important lowland dry heath, dry lowland acid grassland, wood-pasture with veteran trees and ancient semi-natural oak woodland habitats. The fauna of the lowland heath includes a nationally rare butterfly the heath fritillary (Mellicta athalia). The assemblage of beetles associated with the veteran trees is of national significance.

References 

Sites of Special Scientific Interest in Somerset
Sites of Special Scientific Interest notified in 2000